Hunted Women (German:Gehetzte Frauen) is a 1923 German silent film directed by Josef Berger and starring Dary Holm.

Cast
In alphabetical order
 Rudolf Basil 
 Mary Brandt 
 Karl Graumann 
 Dary Holm 
 Ernst Rückert
 Ernst Schrumpf

External links

1923 films
Films of the Weimar Republic
Films directed by Josef Berger
German silent feature films
German black-and-white films